Alexander Vasilyev may refer to:

Alexander Vasiliev (historian) (1867–1953), author of History of the Byzantine Empire
Alexander Pavlovich Vasiliev (1894–1944), Orthodox priest
Alexander Vassiliev (born 1962), Russian journalist
Alexander Vasilyev (musician) (born 1969), Russian musician
Alexandr Vasiliev (ice hockey, born 1989), Russian ice hockey player
Alexander Vasilyev (fashion historian) (born 1958), Russian fashion historian, collector and TV host
Aleksandr Nikolaevich Vasiliev (born 1982), Russian politician

See also
Aleksandr Vasilyev (disambiguation)
Alexey Vasilyev (disambiguation)
 Vasilyev